Saleh Marzouk (born 2 February 1962) is a Kuwaiti swimmer. He competed in the men's 200 metre butterfly at the 1980 Summer Olympics.

References

1962 births
Living people
Kuwaiti male swimmers
Olympic swimmers of Kuwait
Swimmers at the 1980 Summer Olympics
Place of birth missing (living people)
Male butterfly swimmers